Kristineberg is a residential area of Kungsholmen, Stockholm. The land was bought by the city in 1920. Before that it was owned by Kristineberg Palace.

Kristineberg metro station is an outdoor station and was opened on 26 October 1952.

Districts of Stockholm